Girolamo Panzetta (born September 6, 1962, in Villanova del Battista, Italy) is an Italian celebrity living and working in Japan (Gaikokujin tarento). He has appeared on Japanese television in a variety  of shows, including dramas and cooking shows. He has also been featured in fashion magazines. Panzetta voiced the Italian car Luigi in the Japanese version of Cars. He is also the author of several books and essays.  He appeared on over 170 front covers of every edition of Japanese men's fashion magazine LEON since its launch in September 2001.

Filmography

Film
Lady Maiko (2014)
Dosukoi! Sukehira (2019), Italian doctor

Television
Iron Chef (1999) - Himself (Judge)
Matrimonial Chaos (2013), Girolamo Panzetta

Japanese dub
Cars (2006), Luigi
Cars 2 (2011), Luigi
Cars 3 (2017), Luigi

References

External links
 Horipro agency profile 
 

Italian male actors
Expatriate television personalities in Japan
Italian expatriates in Japan
1962 births
Living people